Elections for Haringey Council in London, England were held on 6 May 2010.

Summary of results

Ward results

Alexandra

Bounds Green

Ron Aitken was a sitting councillor for Crouch End ward

Bruce Grove

Crouch End

Fortis Green

Harringay

Highgate

Hornsey

Muswell Hill

Noel Park

Northumberland Park

Seven Sisters

St Ann’s

Stroud Green

Jayanti Patel was a sitting councillor for Woodside ward

Tottenham Green

Tottenham Hale

West Green

White Hart Lane

Woodside

References

Council elections in the London Borough of Haringey
2010 London Borough council elections
May 2010 events in the United Kingdom